Roihau Degage is a footballer from Tahiti currently playing for AS Tefana. He is a member of the Tahiti national football team.

International goals

Honours

Domestic
Tahiti First Division:
 Winner (2): 2010, 2011

Tahiti Cup:
 Winner (2): 2010, 2011

International

OFC Nations Cup:
Winner : 2012

International career statistics

External links

1988 births
Living people
French Polynesian footballers
Tahiti international footballers
Association football forwards
2012 OFC Nations Cup players